Gathorne's shrew or Gathorne's white-toothed shrew (Crocidura gathornei) is a species of mammal in the family Soricidae. It is endemic to northern India.

Taxonomy 
Although specimens of this species were collected as far back as 1913, this species was first described over a century later, in 2013. It is named in honor of British zoologist Gathorne Gathorne-Hardy, 5th Earl of Cranbrook.

Distribution and habitat 
It inhabits open ground with grasses, balsams, and rhododendron, belonging to the Western Himalayan alpine shrub and meadows ecoregion. At other localities, it inhabits the Western Himalayan broadleaf forests ecoregion, but bordering on alpine shrubland.

Status 
Nothing is known about threats to this species, and it has been classified as Data Deficient by the IUCN Red List. No villages or cultivation are known from the vicinity of its type locality.

References 

Crocidura
Endemic fauna of India
Fauna of the Himalayas
Mammals of India
Mammals described in 2013